Bogdan Gavrilović (Serbian Cyrillic: Богдан Гавриловић) (1864–1947) was a Serbian mathematician, physicist, philosopher, and educator. He received his doctorate in sciences mathematiques from the University of Budapest in 1887. He served twice as the Rector of the University of Belgrade and was elected three times as president of the Serbian Royal Academy (1931-1937).

Selected works
 Analitična geometrija tačke, prave, kruga i koničnih preseka I-II, 1896.
 Teorija determinanata, 1899.

See also
 Mihailo Petrović Alas
 Jovan Karamata

External links
Biography (pdf)

1864 births
1947 deaths
Scientists from Novi Sad
Serbian mathematicians
Academic staff of the University of Belgrade
Rectors of the University of Belgrade
Members of the Serbian Academy of Sciences and Arts
Yugoslav mathematicians